Relations between Palestine and Sri Lanka started in 1975 when the Palestine Liberation Organization (PLO) opened up an embassy in Colombo. After the Palestinian Declaration of Independence on 15 November 1988, the Republic of Sri Lanka and the Republic of Maldives were among few of the first countries in the world to recognize the State of Palestine. Left wing government led by Sirimavo Bandaranaike during the 1970s closed down the Israel embassy in support of the Palestinian cause. However, after the right wing government led by J.R. Jayewardene came to power Sri Lanka re-established ties with Israel. Diplomatic ties with Israel were suspended again under president Ranasinghe Premadasa in support of the Palestinian cause. In 2000 however ties with Israel were re-established. Sri Lanka currently supports the two state solution for the conflict. In 2014 Sri Lanka donated 130 million rupees to Palestine as humanitarian aid. During the UN speech of president Maithripala Sirisena he expressed support for the liberation struggle of the Palestinian people and urged the United Nations and all Member States to approach the Palestinian issue in a more humane manner taking the inhumane conditions they face into consideration. Sri Lanka voted in support of Palestine in almost every resolution brought to the UN.

History

The relationship between Sri Lanka and Palestine, particularly the Palestinian Liberation Organization (PLO), can be traced back to 1971 when the left wing Sri Lanka Freedom Party led by Sirimavo Bandaranaike promised to expel the Israel embassy in Sri Lanka in support of the Palestinian cause during their election campaigns. After Sirimavo Bandaranaike came into power the Israel embassy was closed down despite Zionist lobbies in the UK threatening to boycott Sri Lankan Tea. Shortly after closing down the Israel embassy the Sirimavo Bandaranaike invited the PLO to establish diplomatic ties with Sri Lanka. In 1975 the PLO established an embassy in Sri Lanka, a year later the Sri Lanka-Palestine Solidarity Committee was created. In 1997 Palestinian leader Yasser Arafat offered to mediate a settlement for the Sri Lankan Civil War after meeting with the Sri Lankan president Chandrika Kumaratunga.

Current relations
Sri Lanka currently supports a two-state solution to end the on-going conflict between Israel and Palestine in Gaza. Sri Lanka has donated money to Palestine on several occasion. In 2014 Sri Lanka donated a million US dollars to provide humanitarian aid to Palestine. Sri Lanka also strongly opposed the decision by US President Donald Trump to recognise Jerusalem as the capital of Israel in the UN. The Sri Lanka Palestine Parliamentary Friendship Association (SLPPFA) held a massive rally led by the Minister for health and nutrition of Sri Lanka in support of Palestine during the issue. Maithripala Sirisena, the Sri Lankan president and chairperson of the centre-left Sri Lanka Freedom Party, also gave assurance that Sri Lanka is committed to stand by the struggle for independence of the Palestinian people. The president also gave Palestine a plot of land in Colombo to open a new embassy.

See also
 Foreign relations of Palestine 
 Foreign relations of Sri Lanka

References

 
Sri Lanka
Bilateral relations of Sri Lanka